Christopher Keogan (born 26 August 1992) is an English former professional snooker player.

Career
From the town of Doncaster, Yorkshire in England, Keogan started playing snooker at the age of 6. In his early years he was coached by Steve Prest and at age 13 was widely considered one of the most promising upcoming snooker talents, with then world champion Shaun Murphy tipping Keogan as a future world champion himself.
In 2016 at the first event of Q School, Keogan defeated highly rated youngsters Jamie Clarke and Adam Stefanow as well as former professionals Lü Chenwei and Joel Walker before he reached the final round against Marc Davis whom he defeated 4–0, a win which gave Keogan a two-year card to the World Snooker Tour for the 2016–17 season and 2017–18  seasons.
He lost in the last 64 of four events during his first season as a professional. He dropped off the tour at the end of the 2017/18 season but entered Q School in an attempt to win back a place.

Personal life 
Keogan is a keen football fan and is a supporter of Doncaster Rovers. Keogan is also an enthusiastic badminton player. His childhood idol was Paul Hunter. He has three older siblings one brother and two sisters.

Performance and rankings timeline

References

External links

Christopher Keogan at CueTracker.net: Snooker Results and Statistic Database

1992 births
Sportspeople from Doncaster
Living people
English snooker players